Francis Mading Deng is a politician and diplomat from South Sudan who served as the newly independent country's first ambassador to the United Nations from 2012 to July 2016.

Life and career
Deng was educated at Khartoum University (Bachelor of Laws) and Master of Laws (LL.M.) and earned a Doctor of Juridical Science (J.S.D.) from Yale University. He also took graduate courses at King's College London.

Under Sudanese presidents Ismail al-Azhari and Gaafar Nimeiry, Deng served as Human Rights Officer at the United Nations Secretariat (from 1967 to 1972) and subsequently as Ambassador of Sudan to the United States, Canada, Denmark, Finland, Norway, and Sweden. He also served as Sudan's Minister of State for Foreign Affairs. After leaving his country's service, he was appointed as the first Rockefeller Brothers Fund Distinguished Fellow.

From 1992 until 2004 Deng served as the United Nations' first Special Representative on the Human Rights of Internally Displaced Persons.

On 29 May 2007, United Nations Secretary-General Ban Ki-moon announced the appointment of Deng as the new Special Adviser for the Prevention of Genocide, a position he held until 17 July 2012 at the level of Under-Secretary General.

From 2006 to 2007, Deng served as director of the Sudan Peace Support Project based at the United States Institute of Peace. He also was a Wilhelm Fellow at the Center for International Studies of the Massachusetts Institute of Technology and a research professor of international politics, law and society at Johns Hopkins University Paul H. Nitze School of Advanced International Studies.

Before joining the Massachusetts Institute of Technology, Deng was a Distinguished Visiting Scholar at the John Kluge Center of the Library of Congress.

Deng served at the Woodrow Wilson International Center first as a guest scholar and then as a senior research associate, after which he joined the Brookings Institution as a senior fellow, where he founded and directed the Africa Project for 12 years. He was then appointed distinguished professor at the Graduate Center of the City University of New York before joining Johns Hopkins University.

Among his numerous awards in his country and abroad, Deng is co-recipient with Roberta Cohen of the 2005 University of Louisville Grawemeyer Award for "Ideas Improving World Order"  and the 2007 Merage Foundation American Dream Leadership Award. In 2000, Deng also received the Rome Prize for Peace and Humanitarian Action.

From 2012 to July 2016, he served as South Sudan's first ambassador to the United Nations.

Deng is a member of the Crimes Against Humanity Initiative Advisory Council, a project of the Whitney R. Harris World Law Institute at  Washington University School of Law in St. Louis to establish the world’s first treaty on the prevention and punishment of crimes against humanity.

He has authored and edited 40 books in the fields of law, conflict resolution, internal displacement, human rights, anthropology, folklore, history and politics and has also written two novels on the theme of the crisis of national identity in Sudan. He was born in 1938 and in 1972 married Dorothy Anne Ludwig, with whom he has four sons, Donald, Daniel, David and Dennis.

Selected publications 
 Bound by Conflict: Dilemmas of the Two Sudans (International Humanitarian Affairs. with Kevin M. Cahill M.D. (FUP)) (1 March 2016)
 Identity, Diversity, and Constitutionalism in Africa Now (1, 2008)
 Talking it Out: Stories in Negotiating Human Relations (Kegan Paul, 2006)
 A Strategic Vision for Africa: The Kampala Movement, with I. William Zartman (2002)
 African Reckoning: A Quest for Good Governance, co-editor with Terrence Lyons (1998)
 Masses in Flight: The Global Crisis of Internal Displacement, with Roberta Cohen (1998)
 The Forsaken People: Case Studies of the Internally Displaced, co-editor with Roberta Cohen (1998)
 Seed of Redemption, 1986?
 War of Visions: Conflicting Identities in the Sudan (1995)
 Human Rights in Africa: Cross-Cultural Perspectives, ed. with Abdullahi Ahmed An-Na'im (1990)
 Cry of the Owl (Lilian Barber Press, Inc., 1989)
 Tradition and Modernization: A Challenge for Law Among the Dinka of the Sudan (1987)
 Dinka Folktales: African Stories from the Sudan (June 1984)
 Dinka Cosmology (Sudan studies) (1980)
 Dynamics of identification: a basis for national integration in the Sudan (1973)
 The Dinka and their songs (1973)
 The Dinka of the Sudan (1972, Holt, Rinehart and Winston Inc.; 1984, reissued with changes by Waveland Press Inc.)

References

External links 

The Biography of Francis Deng, UN.
Profile — United Nations Office of the Special Adviser to the Secretary-General on the Prevention of Genocide

1938 births
Living people
Yale Law School alumni
Alumni of King's College London
Johns Hopkins University faculty
South Sudanese officials of the United Nations
South Sudanese Africanists
Government ministers of Sudan
Ambassadors of South Sudan to Canada
Ambassadors of Sudan to Canada
Place of birth missing (living people)
University of Khartoum alumni
Ambassadors of Sudan to the United States
Ambassadors of Sudan to Denmark
Ambassadors of Sudan to Norway
Ambassadors of Sudan to Finland
Ambassadors of Sudan to Sweden
Sudanese diplomats
South Sudanese diplomats
Permanent Representatives of South Sudan to the United Nations
Sudanese officials of the United Nations